Othmar Kuhner (born 23 December 1972) is a German former wrestler. He competed in the men's freestyle 58 kg at the 2000 Summer Olympics.

References

External links
 

1972 births
Living people
German male sport wrestlers
Olympic wrestlers of Germany
Wrestlers at the 2000 Summer Olympics
People from Schramberg
Sportspeople from Freiburg (region)
21st-century German people